The 2023 TCR Europe Touring Car Series will be the seventh season of TCR Europe Touring Car Series. The season is planned to began at the Algarve International Circuit in April and to end at the Circuit de Barcelona-Catalunya in October.  It will also feature three rounds of the TCR World Tour.

Calendar 
The calendar was announced with 7 rounds scheduled.

Teams and drivers

Results and standings

References

External links
 

TCR
Europe
TCR Europe